Jefferson Parish Library (JPL) is the library system of Jefferson Parish, Louisiana. It has its headquarters in the East Bank Regional Library in Metairie, an unincorporated area in the parish.

History

Digested from a paper written by Cathy Gontar in 1998

Jefferson Parish, a long, narrow strip of land in southeastern Louisiana, stretches from the southern shore of Lake Pontchartrain to Grand Isle on the Gulf of Mexico. Adjacent to Orleans and Plaquemines Parishes on the east and St. Charles and Lafourche Parishes on the west, it was named after President Thomas Jefferson, who was responsible for the Louisiana Purchase.

The police jury of Jefferson Parish passed a resolution of library establishment in 1946, and the first public library was opened November 30, 1949.

Branches were opened in major cities and towns. At first, none of the original library buildings were owned by the parish. The headquarters and Gretna Branch were originally at Huey P. Long and Fourth Streets on the West Bank, but later moved to Lafayette Street, and second to Second Street. The Gretna Branch in 1968 was moved out of the headquarters building on Second Street to its current location on Willow Drive. The Metairie, Jefferson, Kenner, Harahan, Marrero, Gretna, and Westwego branches were all opened in December 1949. The first Lafitte Branch opened in the town firehouse, and moved in 1982 to its present location on Highway 45. The one-room Grand Isle Branch opened in January 1950.

The Harahan Branch, built in 1955, is the oldest parish library in operation. The Wagner Branch, named for former Parish Librarian Charles Wagner, opened in 1964. The headquarters building on Causeway Boulevard opened in 1967, with closed stacks. The Grand Isle Branch, destroyed by Hurricane Betsy in 1965, was rebuilt in 1970. The Terrytown Branch on the west bank opened in 1974, and was the largest library in the system until the Belle Terre Branch was built in 1981. The Live Oak Library was built on the unexcavated ruins of the Live Oak Plantation in the early 1980s.

The Rosedale Library on Jefferson Highway was completed in 1987. North Kenner Branch, opened in 1985, became the largest parish library, superseded only by the Old Metairie Branch, which was completed in 1988. West Bank Regional was built and opened in 1990, upon the recommendations of HBW Associates of Dallas, a library consultant firm that did a detailed study of the library system in 1983.

The new Westwego Library opened in 1995, and is the largest branch on the west bank, and fourth largest in the library system. The Lakeshore Branch, located near historical Bucktown, was opened in 1995 as well. The new flagship library of the system is the new East Bank Regional, opened in 1997 with 100,000 feet of public space and a collection of 300,000 volumes.

The Marrero Branch, in a rented building on the west bank and which was recommended for closing by the 1983 library study, closed in 1997. In 1997, when library administration attempted to close the Kenner Library, housed in a small storefront on Williams Boulevard, it was opposed by members of the Jefferson Parish Council. The Kenner Library closed August 1, 1998.

A bookmobile was provided by the State Library, and by 1952 there were 3 bookmobiles, one for each side of the river and one for "colored" service. This service continued until the late 60's when the library began phasing out its 5 bookmobiles. The last two bookmobiles were replaced in 1986 by vans used by current outreach services, serving nursing homes, daycare centers, and qualified homebound individuals on both banks of the river.

The library's catalog and many other internet functions were automated in the late 1980s, and the branches first went on-line in 1990. Public microcomputers were also added for public use in the 90s.

Over the past several years, Hurricanes Gustav, Katrina and Rita extensively damaged several of the libraries:

Belle Terre Library: Hurricane Katrina damaged more than 50% of the library, requiring extensive renovations.
East Bank Regional Library: Minor water damage and wind damage on roof from Hurricane Katrina.
Grand Isle Library: Severe damage from Hurricanes Katrina and Gustav, requiring it to be rebuilt.
Gretna Library: Hurricanes Katrina and Gustav damaged 70% of the library, requiring it to be rebuilt.
Harahan Library: Minor damage from Hurricane Katrina, requiring moderate restoration.
Lafitte Library: Moderate damage from Hurricane Katrina but was badly damaged by Hurricane Rita, requiring it to be rebuilt.
Lakeshore Library: Hurricane Katrina damaged 70% of the library, requiring it to be rebuilt.
Live Oak Library: Hurricanes Katrina and Rita damaged 33% of the library, requiring extensive renovations.
North Kenner Library: Some damage during Hurricane Katrina and damage to 33% of the library from Hurricane Rita, requiring extensive renovations.
Old Metairie Library: Hurricane Katrina damaged 15% of the library, requiring modest restoration.
Rosedale Library: Virtually no damage from Hurricanes Katrina and Rita.
Terrytown Library: Hurricane Katrina damaged 20% of the library, requiring moderate restoration.
Wagner Library: Hurricane Katrina damaged 40% of the library, requiring extensive renovations.
West Bank Regional Library: Hurricanes Katrina and Rita damaged 35% of the library, requiring extensive renovations.
Westwego Library: Hurricane Katrina damaged 33% of the library, requiring extensive renovations.
Revised: October 2008

For more information about the current status of the Library, view the Director's Status Report here.

Branches

East Bank:
 East Bank Regional Library (Metairie, unincorporated area)
 Harahan Library (Harahan)
 Lakeshore Library (Metairie, unincorporated area)
 North Kenner Library (Kenner)
 Old Metairie Library (Metairie, unincorporated area)
 River Ridge (River Ridge, unincorporated area)
 Rosedale Library (Jefferson, unincorporated area)
 Wagner Library (Metairie, unincorporated area)

West Bank:
 Jane O'Brien Chatelain West Bank Regional Library (Harvey, unincorporated area)
 Belle Terre Library (Marrero, unincorporated area)
 Cybermobile at Grand Isle Library (Grand Isle)
 Gretna Library (Gretna)
 Lafitte Library (Jean Lafitte)
 Live Oak Library (Waggaman, unincorporated area)
 Terrytown Library (Terrytown, unincorporated area)
 Edith S. Lawson Library in Westwego (Westwego)

References

External links

 Jefferson Parish Library

Education in Jefferson Parish, Louisiana
Public libraries in Louisiana
Buildings and structures in Jefferson Parish, Louisiana